The World as I See It may refer to:

 The World as I See It (book), by Albert Einstein
 "The World as I See It" (song), by Jason Mraz

See also 

 The World as It Is (disambiguation)